Basket-Club Boncourt is a professional basketball team from Boncourt, Switzerland. The team currently plays in the Swiss Basketball League (SBL). Home games of the team are played in Salle Sportive Boncourt which has a seating capacity of 1,500 people. The club has played in the lower-tier European competitions several times, the last time in 2006–07 in the FIBA EuroCup Challenge.

Honours
Swiss Basketball League
Champions (2): 2002–03, 2003–04
Swiss Cup: 1
Winners (1): 2005
 Swiss Basketball League Cup: 2
Winners (2): 2005, 2006

European history
Boncourt made its debut in the European fourth-tier FIBA Europe Cup in the 2003–04 season and consequently would appear in the next three edition as well.

Players

Current roster

Notable players 

  Roman Albrecht
  Sebastien Borter
  Nemanja Calasan
  Nicolas Dos Santos
  Erroyl Bing
  Ivica Radosavljević

References

External links
Official website

Basketball teams established in 1980
Basketball teams in Switzerland